Anders' Earthrise is a lunar impact crater that is located on the southern hemisphere on the far side of the Moon.  It is visible in the foreground of the famous Earthrise photograph (AS08-14-2383) taken by astronaut William Anders on the Apollo 8 mission to the Moon in 1968.  The crater's name was approved by the IAU on 5 October 2018. The crater 8 Homeward, also visible in the Earthrise photograph, was named at the same time.

It lies on the west side of the crater Pasteur, and was formerly named Pasteur T.

References 

William Anders
Apollo 8